Legacy Salmon Creek Medical Center is an acute care hospital in Vancouver, Washington, United States. It is part of Legacy Health, a locally owned, nonprofit organization based in Portland, Oregon.

Legacy Salmon Creek opened in 2005 as the first hospital built in Washington state in almost 20 years. The six-story, 460,000-square-foot hospital and 180,000-square-foot medical office complex cost $285 million. In the hospital's first full fiscal year, Legacy Salmon Creek averaged 80 patients a day. By 2015, the average hospital census was more than 160 patients a day.

Legacy Salmon Creek employs more than 1,200 people.

Among its services are Legacy Cancer Institute, a children's-only emergency room, neonatal intensive care unit, birthing center, total joint (orthopedics) surgery center, breast health center and surgical care.

References

Hospitals in Washington (state)
Vancouver, Washington
2005 establishments in Washington (state)
Hospital buildings completed in 2005